TIPC may refer to:

 Taiwan International Ports Corporation, state-owned shipping company of Taiwan
 Texas Instruments Professional Computer, a computer similar to (but not compatible with) the IBM PC
 Texas Instruments Professional Portable Computer a portable version of the Texas Instruments Professional Computer
 Transparent Inter-process Communication, an inter-process communication service in Linux